Mystery-Bouffe (Misteriya-Buff) is a socialist dramatic play written by Vladimir Mayakovsky in 1918/1921. Mayakovsky stated in a preface to the 1921 edition that "in the future, all persons performing, presenting, reading or publishing Mystery-Bouffe should change the content, making it contemporary, immediate, up-to-the-minute."

Plot

First version
The play was written for the anniversary of the 1917 revolution, and was accepted by the Central Bureau to be part of the festivities. The title is likely a reference to the opera buffa/opéra bouffe, comic opera genres popular at the time. This original version was directed and produced by Vsevolod Meyerhold, and the art was done by Kazimir Malevich. The premiere was in the Theatre of Musical Drama on November 7, 1918.

Mayakovsky himself played the role of the "simple man", as well as some bit roles including Methuselah and one of the demons. This version of the play lasted three seasons.

Second version
After two years, Mayakovsky reworked the text of his play. This second version premiered in the First Theatre of the RSFSR on May 1, 1921. A printed edition of the second version was released in June of that year. This version of the play lasted about 100 shows.

Later versions

A 60-minute animated film adaptation of the play was made in 1969, directed by David Cherkasskiy. It was the first animated feature to be made in Ukraine. The Soviet government banned screenings outside of the Ukrainian SSR. In 2015, the director of the film uploaded it to Youtube.

In 2007, after several decades of the play not being seen anywhere, the Moscow A.R.T.O. theatre put on an updated version of the play which was dubbed "Mystery-Bouffe. The Clean Variant", based on the texts of the first and second versions. It premiered in France on May 1, 2007.

Characters 
 Seven Pairs of the Clean:

1) The Negus of Abyssinia
2) An Indian Raja
3) A Turkish Pasha
4) A Russian Merchant (Speculator)
5) A Chinese
6) A Well-fed Persian
7) Clemenceau
8) A German
9) A Russian Priest
10) An Australian
11) His Wife
12) Lloyd George
13) An American
14) A Diplomat

 Seven Pairs of the Unclean:
1) A Soldier of the Red Army
2) A Lamplighter
3) A Truckdriver
4) A Miner
5) A Carpenter
6) A Farmhand
7) A Servant (Female)
8) A Blacksmith
9) A Baker
10) A Laundress
11) A Seamstress
12) A Locomotive Engineer
13) An Eskimo Fisherman
14) An Eskimo Hunter
 A Compromiser
 An Intellectual
 The Lady with the Hatboxes
 Devils:
1) Beelzebub
2) Master-of-ceremonies Devil
3) First Messenger
4) Second Messenger
5) Guard
6) 20 of the Clean with Horns and Tails
 Saints:
1) Methuselah
2) Jean-Jacques Rousseau
3) Leo Tolstoy
4) Gabriel
5) First Angel
6) Second Angel
7) Angels.
 Jehovah
 Actors of the Promised Land: 
1) A Hammer
2) A Sickle
3) Machines
4) Trains
5) Automobiles
6) A Carpenter's Plane
7) Tongs
8) A Needle
9) A Saw
10) Bread
11) Salt
12) Sugar
13) Fabrics
14) A Boot
15) A Board and Lever
 The Man of the Future

Settings of the Acts
 - The entire universe.
 - The Ark.
 - Hell.
 - Paradise.
 - Lord of chaos.
 - The promised land.

See also
 Mistero Buffo by Dario Fo

References

External links
English translation of the 1921 version
1918 version 
1921 version 

1918 plays
Plays by Vladimir Mayakovsky